The Balearic Sea (endotoponym: Mar Balear in Catalan and Spanish) is a body of water in the Mediterranean Sea between the Balearic Islands and the mainland of Spain. The Ebro River flows into this small sea.

Islands and archipelagoes 
The Balearic islands are divided into two groups: Gimnesias in the northeast, and Pitiusas in the southwest.

Gimnesias 
 Menorca
 Mallorca
 Cabrera

Pitiusas 
 Ibiza
 Formentera

Extent
The International Hydrographic Organization defines the limits of the Balearic Sea as follows:
Between the Islas Baleares and the coast of Spain, bounded:

On the Southwest. A line from Cape Sant Antoni, Valencian Community to Cape Berberia, the Southwest extreme of Formentera (Balearic Islands).

On the Southeast. The South Coast of Formentera, thence a line from Punta Rotja, its Eastern extreme, to the Southern extreme of Cabrera, Balearic Islands and to Illa de l'Aire, off the Southern extreme of Menorca.

On the Northeast. The East coast of Menorca up to Cap Favaritx thence a line to Cape Sant Sebastià Catalonia.

See also
 Gulf of Cádiz
 Gulf of Lion

References

 
Marginal seas of the Mediterranean
Landforms of the Balearic Islands
Seas of Spain